The 2005–06 Eintracht Frankfurt season was the 106th season in the club's football history. In 2005–06 the club played in the Bundesliga, the first tier of German football. It was the club's 101st season in the first tier.

Results

Legend

Friendlies

Bundesliga

League table

Results by round

Matches

DFB-Pokal

Final

Indoor soccer tournaments

Rheinland Cup

Cup der Öffentlichen Versicherungen

Frankfurt Cup

Players

First-team squad
Squad at end of season

Left club during season

Eintracht Frankfurt II

Statistics

Appearances and goals

|}

Transfers

Transferred in

Transferred out

Notes

References

Sources

External links
 Official English Eintracht website 
 Eintracht-Archiv.de
 2005–06 Eintracht Frankfurt season at Fussballdaten.de 

2005-06
German football clubs 2005–06 season